Navagraha (Pron: nævəˈgrɑ:ə) pilgrimages are pilgrimages devoted to Navagraha—the nine (nava) major celestial bodies (Grahas) of Hindu astronomy. These temples are made of stone. These celestial bodies are named Surya (Sun), Chandra (Moon), Mangala (Mars), Budha (Mercury), Brihaspati (Jupiter), Shukra (Venus), Shani (Saturn), Rahu (North Lunar Node) and Ketu (South Lunar Node). Many temples in South India contain a shrine dedicated to the Navagrahas. However, the term Navagraha temples refers to a cluster of nine separate temples, each an abode of one of the Navagrahas.

Navagraha temples in Kerala
In Kerala, the Navagraha temples are rare, like other states. Unlike other Navagraha temples,Kilimarathukavu navagraha temple is elliptical in structure, much like the galaxy.

Navagraha temples in Tamil Nadu
The Navagraha temples in Tamil Nadu near Kumbakonam in Tamil Nadu date from the Chola dynasty. 
As per Hindu legend, Sage Kalava was suffering from serious ailments along with leprosy. He prayed to the Navagrahas, the nine planet deities. The planets were pleased by his devotion and offered cure to the sage. Brahma, the Hindu god of creation, was angered, as he felt that the planets had no powers to give boons to humans. He cursed the nine planets to suffer from leprosy and sent them down to earth in Vellerukku Vanam, the white wild flower jungle - the modern Suryanar Kovil. The planets prayed to Shiva to relieve them of the curse. Shiva appeared to them and said that the place belonged to them and they would have to grace the devotees worshipping them from the place. Each temple is located in a different village, and is considered an abode of one of the Navagrahas. However, eight of these temples are dedicated to Shiva. 

The Surya temple is the only one dedicated to the Graham. In fact, it is dedicated entirely to the worship of the Sun-God and the other navagrahas, the former being the object of worship as the principal deity and the latter as attendant deities. It was built around the 11th or 12th century. The other temples were built earlier, ranging back to 7th-9th century.

 Surya Navagrahastalam -- Sooriyanar Kovil (Thanjavur District) 
 Chandra Navagrahastalam -- Thingalur (Thanjavur District)
 Angaarakan Navagrahastalam -- Vaitheeswaran Kovil (Mayiladuthurai district)
 Budha Navagrahastalam -- Thiruvenkadu (Mayiladuthurai district)
 Guru Navagrahastalam -- Alangudi (Thiruvarur District)
 Sukra Navagrahastalam -- Kanjanur (Thanjavur District)
 Shani Navagrahastalam -- Thirunallar (Karaikal)
 Raahu Navagrahastalam -- Thirunageswaram (Thanjavur District)
 Ketu Navagrahastalam -- Keezhperumpallam    (Mayiladuthurai district)
 Angineeshwar temple—Birth place of Lord Sanieeswarar and Lord Yematharmar, Kodiyalur,  Thirumeyachur,  Thiruvarur District.

Navagraha temples in Chennai Kundrathur

There is a similar cluster of Navagraha temples in Chennai, erstwhile Thondai Nadu in and around Kundrathur.

 Agatheeswarar Temple - Suryan - Kolapakkkam
 Somanaadheeswarar Temple - Chandran - Somangalam
 Vaidheeswaran Temple - Angaragan - Poovirundhavalli (Poondhamalli)
 Sundareswarar Temple - Budhan - Kovur
 Ramanaadheeswarar Temple - Guru - Porur
 Velleeswarar Temple - Sukran - Mangadu
 Agatheeswarar Temple - Shaneeswaran - Pozhichalur
 Neelakandeswarar Temple - Kethu - Gerugambakkam
 Nageshwarar Temple - Rahu - Kundratthur
These were founded by Thiyagaraja Gurukkal and Bhuvaneshwari and their family published to people through small sized book of Navagraha stalam puranam in Chennai.

Thirunelveli 
A separate set of Navagraha temples which are dedicated to Lord Vishnu on the Tiruchendur-Tirunelveli route are called Nava Tirupathi.

 Srivaikuntanathan Permual Temple—Suryan
 Vijayaasana Perumal Temple—Chandran    
 Vaithamanidhi Perumal Temple—Sevvai
 ThiruPulingudi Perumal Temple—Budhan
 AlwarThirunagari Temple—Gurubhagawan
 Makara Nedunkuzhai Kannan Temple—Sukran
 Srinivasa Perumal Temple—Shaniswaran
 Irattai Thiruppathy, Aravindalochanar—Raghu
 Irattai Thiruppathy, Devapiran—Kedhu

Gudiyatham, Nellore 

Navagraha temples  The Navagraha temples listed contain separate shrines for these gods or temple deity worshipped as that god.
Surya Navagrahastalam - Karupulleshwarar temple, Nellore, Gudiyatham
Chandra Navagrahastalam - Sri Linganatha Swamy temple
Angaarakan Navagrahastalam - Sri Mahadevar temple
Budha Navagrahastalam - Sri Semmalai temple
Guru Navagrahastalam - Sri Gurubhagavan temple, Perumbadi.
Sukra Navagrahastalam - Sri Kaalabhairavar temple, Pogalur
Shani Navagrahastalam - Sri Baalasarthuleshwarar temple, Gudiyatham north
Raahu Navagrahastalam - Sri Naganathaswamy temple, near Gudiyatham
Ketu Navagrahastalam - Sri Naganathaswamy temple, near Gudiyatham

Navagraha temple in Assam

The Navagraha Temple is found on the top of Chitrasal Hill (or Navagraha Hill), in Guwahati city, Assam, India. Enshrined in this temple are nine Shivalingams, representing the nine Celestial bodies, each covered with a colored garment symbolic of each of the celestial bodies, with a Shivaligam in the centre symbolising the Sun.

Navagraha temples in Nashik Maharashtra
Shri Anna Ganapati Navgraha Siddhapeetham, Nasik .
Which is 1.5 km from Nasik Road railway station. All Navgraha are residing in nine temple (gabhara/garbhagudi) with their wives.
The only navgraha Siddhapeetham in Maharashtra 
Peth (central Pune), there is a major Navagraha temple behind Shaniwar Wada, which is also specifically devoted to Shani. There is also a Navagraha Maruti temple in Balaji Nagar.
There is a newly constructed Navagraha temple near Dapoli in Ratnagiri district, Maharashtra.
The temple complex is 5 km from Dapoli town on the Dapoli - Mandangad - Mumbai state highway. Go to Kherdi village titha ( junction ) and then take the small tar road to Palavan village.
The temple complex is at a distance of 1.5 km from Kherdi junction. It is owned by Shri Sainath Maharaj Trust, Dombivli ( E ), Thane. The main temple belongs to Sai Baba and there are surrounding temples of Ganapathi, Shivji, Navagraha temple and Sri Dattatreya temple.
Temple complex is very clean and beautifully maintained.

Navgraha temple in Madhya Pradesh
A historical Navagraha temple is established inside the Bada Ganpati Temple just behind Makaleshwar Temple towards Harsidhhi temple in City of Ujjain in Madhya Pradesh. It is believed that it is their since hundreds of years and people are getting blessing and relief when Prey their specially during their Shani -Ssde sati period which is supposed to be the most dreaded phase in one's lifetime.

Devotees worship to all nine planets here and they offer Mustard oil and flowers to Lord Shani at the temple during their prayers.

Devotees have to pray while doing Parikrama of Navagraha stones and present Flowers and or Bel Leaves while performing pooja. It is famous temple.

Navagraha temple in Uttar Pradesh

Navagraha temple - Prayagraj
Navagraha Temple at Prayagraj in Uttar Pradesh-India has been built by Shri Patharchatti Ram Lila Committee in prayagraj . It was opened for public in 2012. It is located in Rambagh area in prayagraj . It can be reached within two minutes from the City Railway Station at Rambagh in prayagraj.

There are other temples as well in it as below

 Shri Khatu Shyam Temple
 Shri Ram Temple

Nowadays, a very special Jhaanki of Ganga Avataran is under construction and is expected to complete by Nov 2012.

Navagrah temple - Karari Kaushambi
Navagrah temple - Karari kaushambi

Navagrah temple at Karari Kaushambi in Uttar Pradesh was built by Shri Somnath Verma. It was opened to the public in 2017, in Ashok Nager in Karari Kaushambi. It can be reached within 15 minutes from the Bharwari railway station at Ashok Nagar.

There other gods are in it as well: 
 Ram Darbar
 Radha Krishna
 Shiv parivar
 Maa Durga
 Ganesh Bhagwan
 Hanuman Ji

See also
 Navagraha Jain Temple
 Navagraha temple tour in Tamil Nadu - Step by Step Guide
 Jyotisha
 Nakshatra
 Navagraha
 Saptarishi
 List of Hindu deities
 List of Hindu pilgrimage sites
 List of Natchathara temples
 List of Hindu temples

References

Various Navagraha Temples
Navagraha Temples in Assam
Navagraha temples in Kumbakonam, Tamil Nadu
Navagraha Temples in Tamil Nadu
Navagraha Temple on Google Maps - Virtual Darshan of Navagraha Sthalam

 
Navagraha